Stranje pri Škocjanu is a small settlement on the left bank of the Krka River in the Municipality of Škocjan in southeastern Slovenia. Within the municipality, it belongs to the Village Community of Dobrava pri Škocjanu and Tomažja Vas. The area is part of the historical region of Lower Carniola. The municipality is now included in the Southeast Slovenia Statistical Region.

Name
The name of the settlement was changed from Stranje to Stranje pri Škocjanu in 1953. In the past the German name was Streine.

Cultural heritage
There is archaeological evidence of prehistoric and Roman settlement in the area.

References

External links
Stranje pri Škocjanu at Geopedia

Populated places in the Municipality of Škocjan